Jessica Larsson is a Swedish two-time world champion bridge player.

Bridge accomplishments

Wins
 Venice Cup (2) 2019, 2022

References

External links
 

Swedish contract bridge players
Year of birth missing (living people)
Living people